The 1992 NCAA Division I softball tournament was the eleventh annual tournament to determine the national champion of NCAA women's collegiate softball. Held during May 1992, twenty Division I college softball teams contested the championship. The tournament featured eight regionals of either two or three teams, each in a double elimination format. The 1992 Women's College World Series was held in Oklahoma City, Oklahoma from May 23 through May 26 and marked the conclusion of the 1992 NCAA Division I softball season.  UCLA won their seventh championship by defeating defending champions Arizona 2–0 in the final game.

Qualifying

Regionals

Regional No. 1

UCLA qualifies for WCWS, 2–0

Regional No. 2

Arizona qualifies for WCWS, 2–0

Regional No. 3

Fresno State qualifies for WCWS, 2–0

Regional No. 4

California qualifies for WCWS, 2–0

Regional No. 5

First elimination round
 2,  0
 1, Toledo 0
Cal State Fullerton 3, Long Beach State 211

Second elimination round

Long Beach State qualifies for WCWS, 3–1

Regional No. 6

First elimination round
 4,  0
 2, Western Illinois 0

Second elimination round

Kansas qualifies for WCWS, 3–0

Regional No. 7

First elimination round
 5,  1
UMass 1,  0
Connecticut 1, Utah State 08

Second elimination round

UMass qualifies for WCWS, 3–1

Regional No. 8

First elimination round
 1,  010
Southwestern Louisiana 1,  0
Florida State 4, UNLV 0;

Second elimination round

Florida State qualifies for WCWS, 3–0

Women's College World Series

Participants
Arizona

UCLA

Game results

Bracket

Championship Game

All-Tournament Team
The following players were named to the All-Tournament Team

See also
Women's College World Series
NCAA Division II Softball Championship
NCAA Division III Softball Championship
College World Series

References

1992 NCAA Division I softball season
NCAA Division I softball tournament